The Woman in the Dolphin is a 1920 silent German film directed by Artur Kiekebusch-Brenken for Gaci Film, written by Jan Gramatzki and featuring Béla Lugosi. The camerawork was handled by Karl Freund, who years later was the cinematographer on Lugosi's 1931 Dracula and Universal Pictures' classic The Mummy. A still from the film exists online showing a youthful Lugosi with a very full moustache in this lead role. The film itself is lost.

Cast
 Emilie Sannom as Ellinor Wingord
 Magnus Stifter as Gordon
 Rudolf Hilberg as Fürst
 Béla Lugosi as Tom Bill
 Ernst Pittschau as Harold Holm
 Jacques Wandryck
 Max Zilzer

See also
 Béla Lugosi filmography

References

External links

1920 films
German black-and-white films
Films of the Weimar Republic
German silent feature films
Lost German films